Benedetti dal Signore (Blessed by the Lord) is a 2004 Italian comedy television series set in a convent of Franciscan friars.

See also
List of Italian television series

External links
 

Italian television series